Romania competed at the 2011 Summer Universiade in Shenzhen, China.

Medalists

Athletics

Men

Women

Basketball

Romania has qualified a men's team.

Fencing

Men

Women

Judo

Men

Women

Swimming

Men

Women

Table tennis

Women
Team

Singles

Doubles

Men

Singles

Doubles

Mixed doubles

Weightlifting

Men

References

2011 in Romanian sport
Nations at the 2011 Summer Universiade
Romania at the Summer Universiade